Alexander Kininmonth may refer to:

 Alexander de Kininmund (d. 1344), archdeacon of Lothian and bishop of Aberdeen
 Alexander de Kininmund (d. 1380), archdeacon of Aberdeen and bishop of Aberdeen